Hit Me is a 1996 American crime film directed by Steven Shainberg starring Elias Koteas, Laure Marsac, and William H. Macy. The film is based on the novel A Swell-Looking Babe by Jim Thompson.

Plot
Sonny lives with his intellectually disabled older brother Leroy and works as a bellhop in a hotel, struggling to pay back a loan to Jack Cougar, the head of hotel security. Sonny is attracted to Monique, a hotel guest who says she is from Paris and slits her wrists in front of him as a cry for help. He is warned not to have sex with the guests because the hotel manager Mr. Stillwell wishes to run a respectable business and regain the third star that the hotel has lost, yet Monique continually tempts him aggressively. After he relents and has sex with her, she suddenly stands up and begins screaming. Sonny punches her out in a panic and flees the room.

Del, a former bellhop now working for local gangster Lenny Ish and staying in the room next to Monique, tells Sonny that he will take care of the situation. Sonny sees Del and Cougar forcibly removing Monique from the hotel and tells Del that he does not want her to be killed by Cougar. Del says that she could be paid to keep quiet for $5,000 and invites Sonny to take part in a heist of Lenny Ish's high-stakes poker game at the hotel, promising to give Lenny 10% of the total haul of $700,000. Monique visits Sonny one night and confesses that she is actually from Montreal, was hired by Del to be a hostess at the poker game, and was then hired to seduce Sonny and scream that it was rape in order to force him into participating in the heist.

The heist takes place the Tuesday night before the Wednesday poker game. Cougar takes the keys to the hotel safety deposit boxes from the poker players at gunpoint. The other two bellhops, Bascomb and Billy, are supposed to take a break to eat and leave Sonny alone at this time but have decided to just eat at the front desk instead. Del arrives and forces Bascomb to hand the stolen keys to Sonny but during the handover the keys are dropped and mixed up. Bascomb and Sonny hurriedly try the forty keys in each of the forty lock boxes. Sonny closes the security door and locks himself and Bascomb in the lock box room. Billy attempts to talk Del and Cougar out of the heist but is shot dead by Cougar. Cougar shoots Bascomb through the mail slot in the door then pushes the gun through it and tells Sonny to finish him off as he and Del leave the hotel. Sonny, wearing gloves, uses the gun to kill Bascomb. Sonny puts his share of $70,000 in a child's backpack and gives it to his brother to drive home. He takes the remaining money from Bascomb's corpse and puts it in a bag, which he sends up to Monique's room in the elevator.

An interrogator questions Sonny at the police station, telling him that no losses were declared by the robbed guests due to the illegal nature of the planned poker game. Sonny insists that he was not involved and is released. He receives a call from Del claiming that Monique is demanding the money and that Sonny is to leave it in the trunk of a specific Cadillac for them, but Sonny knows that he is lying about Monique. Sonny admits to Monique that he killed Bascomb and they make plans to run away together with his share of the money. Sonny is confronted by Del and Cougar at the drop-off and they insist that Monique demands Sonny's share as well. Sonny angrily tells them that Monique is with him. When Cougar puts a gun to Sonny's head, Monique comes out from her hiding spot and shoots Cougar. Del runs away with the money and Monique chases after him and shoots him. Sonny finishes him off with another bullet. Monique wipes the gun clean and they return home to Leroy.

Lenny Ish and one of his enforcers confront Sonny at his home and demand the money. Ish explains that he had planned to be robbed in exchange for part of the money but that Del and Cougar betrayed him. Sonny and Monique give him the money, which Ish says he will loan to Mr. Stillwell to pay off the victims of the heist in exchange for a controlling interest in the hotel. They leave Sonny alive, telling him that he will get a bellhop's cut. Monique then departs, leaving Sonny and Leroy alone again. Sonny tells Leroy that he will take him to a place beyond outer space that is full of toys where he can eat the mist like candy.

Cast
 Elias Koteas as Sonny Rose
 Laure Marsac as Monique Roux
 Jay Leggett as Leroy Rose
 Bruce Ramsay as Del Towbridge
 Kevin J. O'Connor as Cougar
 Philip Baker Hall as Lenny Ish
 J.C. Quinn as Fred Bascomb
 Haing S. Ngor as Billy Tungpet
 William H. Macy as Policeman
 Jack Conley as Mr. Ish's Bodyguard

Production
This was Haing S. Ngor's last film, who passed away seven months before the film’s release.

Its working title was The Ice Cream Dimension and some resources may still list it as such.

Release
The film premiered at the Toronto International Film Festival on September 9, 1996, followed by a release in US theaters on September 25, 1998.

Reception
The film received mixed reviews.

References

External links
 

1996 films
1996 crime thriller films
1996 crime drama films
1996 directorial debut films
1996 drama films
1990s English-language films
American crime thriller films
American crime drama films
Films directed by Steven Shainberg
Films based on Jim Thompson novels
Films with screenplays by Denis Johnson
1990s American films